Narcissus assoanus, the  rush-leaf jonquil, is a perennial bulbous plant native to Spain and France; it is now naturalized in Turkey. It grows to 15 cm (6 in) in height and has yellow flowers with a slightly lemony fragrance. Subspecies include N. assoanus subsp. assoanus and N. assoanus subsp. praelongus.

References

Bibliography 

 
 
 
Flora Catalana Narcissus assoanus

assoanus
Flora of France
Flora of Turkey
Flora of Spain
Plants described in 1830